Edna Jessop (10 October 1926 – 15 September 2007) is considered to be the first female to lead a droving team.

Edna Jessop was born Edna Zigenbine to a family of drovers who worked largely along the stock routes of northern Australia in Western Queensland, the Northern Territory and the north of Western Australia.  Jessop made headlines in Australia and internationally when she was called upon to take over the delivery by droving of 1,550 bullocks from  Bedford Downs Station in Western Australia to Dajarra, Queensland, a distance of 2,240 kilometres, after her father was incapacitated in a fall from a horse.

Jessop married John Jessop, also a drover, and moved to the Mount Isa area in about 1960 to ensure education for her son, Jack, and worked for the Mount Isa City Council.

References

External links
Obituary in local paper
Obituary ABC North West Queensland
Photo of Edna and sister, State Library of Victoria
1993 Interview with Edna Jessop

2007 deaths
1926 births
Australian stockmen